Benzo may refer to:

 Shorthand notation for Benzodiazepine
 A chemical Functional group, by which an extra aromatic ring is added to an already ansaturated or aromatic compound.